Kherkheulidze was a Georgian noble family, originally in the southern province of Samtskhe where they held the locale called Kherkheti. At the end of the 12th century, one of the members of this house is said to have appointed to the Alan district of Nar where he married a local noblewoman and produced a new line of the family. Under the Russian rule, the Kherkheulidze were confirmed in the dignity of knyaz (1825, 1850, 1864).

The Kherkheulidze family was made famous by the 17th-century military commander Aghatang and his nine sons who bore the Georgian battle flag and all died at the Battle of Marabda in 1625.

Notable people with this name 
 Baaka Kherkheulidze
 Nine Brothers Kherkheulidze

References 

Georgian-language surnames